Robin Tristan Kalem (born 14 July 2002) is a German professional footballer who plays as a midfielder for FC Schaffhausen in the Swiss Challenge League, on loan from Grasshopper.

Professional career
Kalem joined the Grasshopper academy in 2008 at only six years of age. He made his professional debut for the first team mere days after his 18th birthday, on 17 July 2020, in 0–1 defeat against Lausanne-Sport in the Swiss Challenge League. He scored his first goal in the Swiss Cup against Stade Lausanne-Ouchy on 12 September 2020 and continued making appearances for the first squad until he broke his toe in April 2021, thus missing the remainder of the season.

For the 2021–22 season, he was loaned out to FC Schaffhausen in the Swiss Challenge League, to earn some experience, along with fellow GC youth Fabio Fehr. He collected a total of 30 caps for Schaffhausen and scored one goal, along with supplying four assists. 

He returned to Grasshopper for the preparation of the 2022–23 season. On 14 July 2022, a few days before the start of the season, he returned to Schaffhausen for another half season loan spell, along with teammate Leonardo Uka. On 20 January 2023, he extended his contract with GC for a further year with an option to extend. After completing the winter break with his parent club, he returned to Schaffhausen for the remainder of the season together with teammate Simone Stroscio.

Personal life
Born in Stühlingen, on the German-Swiss border, Kalem's talent was noticed at a children's tournament at five years of age.

He earned his Federal Diploma of Commerce on 15 July 2022.

References

External links
 
 SFL Profile

2002 births
Living people
German footballers
Grasshopper Club Zürich players
Swiss Super League players
Association football midfielders